Aaley Mohammad Iqbal (Hindi: आले मोहम्मद इकबाल), also popularly known as Aaley Bhai is a politician from Old Delhi and is currently the Deputy Mayor of Delhi Municipal Corporation. He is also the elected councillor from Chandni Mahal Ward of Matia Mahal Assembly constituency. He has been elected for Delhi MCD 3 times in 2012, 2017 and 2022.

He is also the President of the All India Crossminton Organization.

Early life
He is the son of Shoaib Iqbal, MLA from Matia Mahal.

Political career

At the age of 22,  Aaley Mohammad made his debut in MCD by winning 2012 election as RLD candidate from Turkman Gate.

Aaley Iqbal was chairman of the City Sadar Paharganj Zone.

In the 2022 Delhi MCD elections, Aaley Muhammad Iqbal won the elections with highest margin. He defeated Mohammad Hamid of INC by a margin of 17134 votes.

Hs was nominated for the post of Deputy Mayor of MCD by Aam Aadmi Party PAC. His appointment was seen as Muslim vote appeasement by Aam Aadmi Party since it had lost all wards in riot hit North East Delhi. Political analyst Rashid Kidwai said AAP is increasingly engaging in the same kind of politics for minorities that once Congress did.

On 22 February 2023, Aaley won the election for the Deputy Mayor post. He received 31 more votes than his only rival of the Bhartiya Janta Party-Kamal Bagri. In total he had received 147 votes against his rival Kamal Bagri's 116.

Accusations
In 2015, a case was lodged against him in Darya Ganj Police Station for the offences punishable under Sections 186/535/506/34 of the IPC and Section 3 (1) (x) of the SC & ST (Prevention of Atrocities) Act.

References 

Year of birth missing (living people)
Living people
Aam Aadmi Party politicians from Delhi